Angelo Bruschini is an English guitarist, hailing from Bristol. He has been a member of The Numbers, Rimshots, The Blue Aeroplanes, and currently with Massive Attack. He produced Strangelove's eponymous album in 1997. He also played guitar for Jane Taylor's award-winning single "Blowing This Candle Out" in 2003.

References

External links
 [ Angelo Bruschini at Allmusic]
 Angelo Bruschini MySpace page

British rock guitarists
British male guitarists
Living people
Year of birth missing (living people)